Aloe reynoldsii  is a species of plant in the Asphodelaceae family.

Description

Aloe reynoldsii is a succulent without a stem or with very short stems, with leaves gathered in a rosette. The leaves are bluish-green, elongated, fleshy, with a waxy texture, longitudinal lines and with numerous pale green spots and tiny whitish teeth on the margins. The inflorescences show numerous yellow tubular flowers, slightly swollen at the base. The flowering period occurs during September.

Aloe reynoldsii is often confused with its close relative, Aloe striata (the coral aloe), and they do look very similar. However Aloe reynoldsii has waxy, toothed leaf margins and yellow flowers, while the coral aloe has smooth leaf margins and red flowers.

Distribution and habitat
This species is endemic to South Africa. Here it is found naturally in the far east of the Eastern Cape Province, where it occurs on cliffs near the mouth of the Bashee River, in areas with a high humidity factor. It is listed as a vulnerable species.

See also
Asphodeloideae
Succulent plants

References

External links

 Succulents
 World Checklist of Selected Plant Families. 
 Flora africana

reynoldsii
Flora of the Cape Provinces